The 2008–09 CEV Cup was the 37th edition of the European CEV Cup volleyball club tournament.

Lokomotiv-Belogorie Belgorod beat Panathinaikos Athens in the finale. Colombian Liberman Agamez was chosen the Most Valuable Player of the tournament.

Participating teams

Main phase

16th Finals
The 16 winning teams from the 1/16 Finals will compete in the 1/8 Finals playing Home & Away matches. The losers of the 1/16 Final matches will qualify for the 3rd round in Challenge Cup.

|}

First leg

|}

Second leg

|}

8th Finals

|}

First leg

|}

Second leg

|}

4th Finals

|}

First leg

|}

Second leg

|}

Challenge phase

|}

First leg 

|}

Second leg 

|}

Final phase
Venue:  Athens Olympic Indoor Hall, Athens

Semi finals

|}

3rd place

|}

Final

|}

Final standing

Awards

Most Valuable Player
  Liberman Agamez (Panathinaikos Athens)
Best Setter
  Denis Ignatyev (Lokomotiv-Belogorie Belgorod)
Best Receiver
  Renaud Herpe (Panathinaikos Athens)

Best Blocker
  Vladimir Nikolov (Bre Banca Lannutti Cuneo)
Best Spiker
  Ilias Lappas (Panathinaikos Athens)
Best Server
  Sergey Khoroshev (Lokomotiv-Belogorie Belgorod)
Best Scorer
  Liberman Agamez (Panathinaikos Athens)

References

External links
 CEV Cup 08-09

2008-09
2008 in volleyball
2009 in volleyball